MAX-interacting protein 1 is a protein that in humans is encoded by the MXI1 gene.

Function 

Expression of the c-myc gene, which produces an oncogenic transcription factor, is tightly regulated in normal cells but is frequently deregulated in human cancers. The protein encoded by this gene is a transcriptional repressor thought to negatively regulate MYC function, and is therefore a potential tumor suppressor. This protein inhibits the transcriptional activity of MYC by competing for MAX, another basic helix-loop-helix protein that binds to MYC and is required for its function. Defects in this gene are frequently found in patients with prostate tumors. Three alternatively spliced transcripts encoding different isoforms have been described. Additional alternatively spliced transcripts may exist but the products of these transcripts have not been verified experimentally.

Interactions 

MXI1 has been shown to interact with SMC3 and MAX.

References

Further reading

External links 
 
 

Transcription factors